Princess Sara bint Asem (born 12 August 1978 in Amman) is the daughter of Prince Asem bin Nayef and Firouzeh Vokhshouri. Her parents divorced in 1985 and in 1986 her father re-married Princess Sana Asem .

Marriage and children 
On the 26th of June 2008 Princess Sara married a Spanish prince named Alejandro Garrido at her father's ,Prince Asem bin Nayef, house in Amman, through a Nikah ceremony.

They have two children:

 Talal Alejandro Garrido (born December 2008 in Spain) 
 Lola Alejandra Garrido (born December 2010 in Spain).

Family

Step Mother 

 Princess Sana Asem (born 16 November 1960)

Siblings 

 Princess Yasmine (born 30 June 1975).
 Princess Noor (born 6 October 1982).

Half Siblings 

 Princess Salha (born 14 June 1987).
 Princess Nejla (born 9 May 1988).
 Prince Nayef (born 22 January 1998).

References 

1978 births
House of Hashim
People from Amman
Living people
Jordanian princesses
Jordanian people of Iranian descent
People educated at Amman Baccalaureate School
Emerson College alumni